Kostiantynivka is an industrial city in the Donetsk Oblast (province) of eastern Ukraine, on the  river. Administratively, it is incorporated as a city of oblast significance. It also serves as the administrative center of Kostiantynivka Raion (district), though it does not belong to it. It's also known as Kostyantynivka or Konstantinovka. It developed in the Soviet era into a major centre for the production of iron, zinc, steel and glass.

History

In 1870 Kostiantynivka was founded by a land owner named Nomikossov who built the settlement in honor of his oldest son, Kostiantyn. In the beginning of the 20th century Kostiantynivka developed into an industrial settlement, and was later raised into the rank of an urban type (1926). In 1932 Kostyantynivka was granted municipal rights.

During World War II, the German occupiers operated a forced labour camp in the town.

During the Russian military intervention in Ukraine, the town was captured in mid-April 2014 by pro-Russian separatists. The city was eventually retaken by Ukrainian forces on 7 July 2014, along with Druzhkivka. In September 2014, refugees extensively arrived in the town from occupied territories. People came to buy cheaper essential products, as well as to arrange pensions and social benefits in the municipal institutions. At the same time, the mechanism of receiving benefits and social payments for migrants at a new place of residence was simplified. The city began to operate a refugee housing center.

2022 Russian invasion of Ukraine

Beginning on February 24, the Russians began their invasion of Ukraine. In the first few hours of the war, Kostiantynivka was struck by missiles targeting a local military base. The area was occasionally shelled and bombarded during Russia's "phase one" of its invasion. Kostiantynivka saw more bombardment in the "Second Phase" of the war, in which the Russians focused their attack to the east of Ukraine. Kostiantynivka saw heavy shelling and missile attacks, targeting fuel depots and power plants. As it was near the frontlines, residents of the city could hear shelling and fighting daily. The city has remained in Ukrainian control, but has suffered from Russian strikes.

Russia reported on 20 March 2022 that Kostiantynivka was hit by a Russian hypersonic Kh-47M2 Kinzhal missile, hitting a fuel depot and causing a fire in the city. This was confirmed by U.S. president Joe Biden.

Kostiantynivka got shelled by Russian Armed Forces in 17 September 2022, causing 5 civilian injuries/deaths and many destructions in-city.

Transport
Kostiantynivka formerly had a tram network, which towards the end of its service suffered from increasingly disrupted traffic. The tram system first opened in 1931, closed in 2004 and reopened in 2005. In World War II, the tram infrastructure was destroyed by the retreating Wehrmacht in 1943 and restored in 1944. During German occupation, trams operated in coupled pairs, with one carriage for civilians and the other for soldiers. In 2012, 150 meters of the overhead network were stolen. For a while, the tram company had been unprofitable and thus threatened the closure of route 3. It remained open until 2014, due to complaints sent to the city office, though it would nonetheless close in 2014 due to the 'poor condition of the northern overpass'. From 2015 on, only one car was operable, with all others lacking bogies. In the same year, tram traffic closed, due to construction work on the Severnyi railway viaduct, closing the final route 4. However, work on the viaduct never occurred, and tram traffic was restored using only 1 car on route 4. When 2 km of contact was stolen around 26 December 2016, the operator could not afford to repair the stolen infrastructure, so it was closed on 29 March 2018.

Demographics
As of the Ukrainian Census of 2001:

Ethnicity
 Ukrainians: 59.3%
 Russians: 37.7%
 Armenians: 1.0%
 Belarusians: 0.5%
 Azerbaijanis: 0.3%
 Jews: 0.2%

 Language
Russian: 78.1%
Ukrainian: 21.0%
Armenian: 0.5%
Belarusian: 0.1%

References

External links
  Konstantinovka - My Home! Information Portal

 
Cities in Donetsk Oblast
Bakhmutsky Uyezd
Cities of regional significance in Ukraine
Populated places established in 1870
Populated places established in the Russian Empire
Kramatorsk Raion